Yellandu Assembly constituency is a Scheduled Tribe reserved constituency of Telangana Legislative Assembly, India. It is one among 5 constituencies in Bhadradri Kothagudem district. It is part of Mahabubabad Lok Sabha constituency.

Currently the constituency is held by Banoth Haripriya.

Mandals
The Assembly Constituency presently comprises the following mandals:

Members of Legislative Assembly

Election results

Telangana Legislative Assembly election, 2018

Telangana Legislative Assembly election, 2014

See also
 List of constituencies of Telangana Legislative Assembly

References

Assembly constituencies of Telangana
Bhadradri Kothagudem district
Constituencies established in 1952
1952 establishments in India